The 2018–19 Olympique Lyonnais Féminin season was the club's fifthteenth season since FC Lyon joined OL as its women's section. Olympique Lyonnais retained their Division 1 Féminine and UEFA Women's Champions League titles, and won the Coupe de France Féminine for the seventh time in eight season having been Runners Up to Paris Saint-Germain the previous season.

Season events
On 2 July, Olympique Lyonnais signed Lisa Weiß from SGS Essen and Carolin Simon from SC Freiburg, both to two-year contracts.

On 23 July, Olympique Lyonnais announced the signing of Izzy Christiansen from Manchester City.

On 24 September, Jess Fishlock joined Olympique Lyonnais on loan until the end of Olympique Lyonnais' participation in the UEFA Women's Champions League.

On 11 January, Olympique Lyonnais announced the signing of Sole Jaimes from Dalian.

Squad

Transfers

In

Loans in

Loans out

Released

Friendlies

International Champions Cup

Competitions

Overview

Division 1

Results summary

Results by matchday

Results

Table

Coupe de France

UEFA Champions League

Final

Squad statistics

Appearances 

|-
|colspan="14"|Players away from the club on loan:
|-
|colspan="14"|Players who appeared for Olympique Lyonnais but left during the season:
|}

Goal scorers

Clean sheets

Disciplinary record

References 

Olympique Lyonnais
Olympique Lyonnais Féminin